Tar Hollow State Forest is a state forest in Hocking, Ross, and Vinton counties in the U.S. state of Ohio. It is part of an area of protected land that also includes Tar Hollow State Park.

Tar Hollow State Forest originated from the Ross-Hocking Land Utilization project of the 1930s. The purpose of the program was to locate families to more productive land, thereby enabling them to better sustain a living. Following termination of the project, the land was leased to the Division of Forestry, and finally transferred to the State in 1958. Tar Hollow is Ohio's third largest state forest, containing 16,120 acres.

References

External links
U.S. Geological Survey Map at the U.S. Geological Survey Map Website. Retrieved November 21st, 2022.

Ohio state forests
Protected areas of Ross County, Ohio
Protected areas of Vinton County, Ohio
Protected areas of Hocking County, Ohio
Protected areas established in 1958
1958 establishments in Ohio